Methanol fuel is an alternative biofuel for internal combustion and other engines, either in combination with gasoline or independently.  Methanol (CH3OH) is less expensive to produce sustainably than ethanol fuel, although it produces more toxic effects than ethanol and has lower energy density than gasoline.  Methanol is safer for the environment than gasoline, it is an anti-freeze, it keeps the engine clean, it has a higher flashpoint in case of fire, and it is the equivalent of super high-octane gasoline in terms of the resulting horsepower.   It can readily be used in most modern engines with a simple software setting tweak and occasionally a change in a cheap fuel seal or line.  To prevent vapor lock in any possible circumstances due to being a simple, pure fuel, a small percentage of other fuel or certain additives can be included.  Methanol (a methyl group linked to a hydroxyl group) may be made from hydrocarbon or renewable resources, in particular natural gas and biomass respectively. It can also be synthesized from CO (carbon dioxide) and hydrogen.  Methanol fuel is currently used by racing cars in many countries but has not seen widespread use otherwise.

History and production
Historically, methanol was first produced by destructive distillation (pyrolysis) of wood, resulting in its common English name of wood alcohol.

At present, methanol is usually produced using methane (the chief constituent of natural gas) as a raw material. In China, methanol is made for fuel from coal.

"Bio-methanol" may be produced by gasification of organic materials to synthesis gas followed by conventional methanol synthesis. This route can offer renewable methanol production from biomass at efficiencies up to 75%. Widespread production by this route has a proposed potential to offer methanol fuel at a low cost and with benefits to the environment (see Hagen, SABD & Olah references below). These production methods, however, are not suitable for small-scale production.

Recently, methanol fuel has been produced using renewable energy and carbon dioxide as a feedstock. Carbon Recycling International, an Icelandic-American company, completed the first commercial scale renewable methanol plant in 2011.

It is also being produced from municipal solid waste by Enerkem at its Edmonton facility.

Major fuel use
During the OPEC 1973 oil crisis, Reed and Lerner (1973) proposed methanol from coal as a proven fuel with well-established manufacturing technology and sufficient resources to replace gasoline. Hagen (1976) reviewed prospects for synthesizing methanol from fossil and renewable resources, its use as a fuel, economics, and hazards.  Then in 1986, the Swedish Motor Fuel Technology Co. (SBAD) extensively reviewed the use of alcohols and alcohol blends as motor fuels. It reviewed the potential for methanol production from natural gas, very heavy oils, bituminous shales, coals, peat and biomass.
In 2005, 2006 Nobel prize winner George A. Olah, G. K. Surya Prakash and Alain Goeppert advocated an entire methanol economy based on energy storage in synthetically produced methanol. The Methanol Institute, the methanol trade industry organization, posts reports and presentations on methanol. Director Gregory Dolan presented the 2008 global methanol fuel industry in China.

On January 26, 2011, the European Union's Directorate-General for Competition approved the Swedish Energy Agency's award of 500 million Swedish kronor (approx. €56M as at January 2011) toward the construction of a 3 billion Swedish kronor (approx. €335M) industrial scale experimental development biofuels plant for production of Biomethanol and BioDME at the Domsjö Fabriker biorefinery complex in Örnsköldsvik, Sweden, using Chemrec's black liquor gasification technology.

Uses

Internal combustion engine fuel
Both methanol and ethanol burn at lower temperatures than gasoline and both are less volatile, making the engine starting in cold weather more difficult. Using methanol as a fuel in spark-ignition engines can offer increased thermal efficiency and increased power output (as compared to gasoline) due to its high octane rating (114) and high heat of vaporization. However, its low energy content of 19.7 MJ/kg and stoichiometric air-to-fuel ratio of 6.42:1 mean that fuel consumption (on volume or mass bases) will be higher than hydrocarbon fuels. The extra water produced also makes the charge rather wet (similar to hydrogen/oxygen combustion engines) and with the formation of acidic products during combustion, the wearing of valves, valve seats, and cylinders might be higher than with hydrocarbon burning. Certain additives may be added to the fuel in order to neutralize these acids.

Methanol, like ethanol, contains soluble and insoluble contaminants.<ref>Brinkman, N., Halsall, R., Jorgensen, S.W., & Kirwan, J.E., "The Development Of Improved Fuel Specifications for Methanol (M85) and Ethanol (Ed85), SAE' Technical Paper 940764</ref> These soluble contaminants, halide ions such as chloride ions, have a large effect on the corrosivity of alcohol fuels. Halide ions increase corrosion in two ways; they chemically attack passivating oxide films on several metals causing pitting corrosion, and they increase the conductivity of the fuel. Increased electrical conductivity promotes electric, galvanic, and ordinary corrosion in the fuel system. Soluble contaminants, such as aluminum hydroxide, itself a product of corrosion by halide ions, clog the fuel system over time.

Methanol is hygroscopic, meaning it will absorb water vapor directly from the atmosphere. Because absorbed water dilutes the fuel value of the methanol (although it suppresses engine knock), and may cause phase separation of methanol-gasoline blends, containers of methanol fuels must be kept tightly sealed.

Compared to gasoline, methanol is more tolerant to exhaust gas recirculation (EGR), which improves fuel efficiency of the internal combustion engines utilizing Otto cycle and spark ignition.

An acid, albeit weak, methanol attacks the oxide coating that normally protects the aluminium from corrosion:

6 CH3OH + Al2O3 → 2 Al(OCH3)3 + 3 H2O

The resulting methoxide salts are soluble in methanol, resulting in a clean aluminium surface, which is readily oxidized by dissolved oxygen.  Also, the methanol can act as an oxidizer:

6 CH3OH + 2 Al → 2 Al(OCH3)3 + 3 H2

This reciprocal process effectively fuels corrosion until either the metal is eaten away or the concentration of CH3OH is negligible. Methanol's corrosivity has been addressed with methanol-compatible materials and fuel additives that serve as corrosion inhibitors.

Organic methanol, produced from wood or other organic materials (bioalcohol), has been suggested as a renewable alternative to petroleum-based hydrocarbons. Low levels of methanol can be used in existing vehicles with the addition of cosolvents and corrosion inhibitors.

Racing
Pure methanol is required by rule to be used in Champcars, Monster Trucks, USAC sprint cars (as well as midgets, modifieds, etc.), and other dirt track series, such as World of Outlaws, and Motorcycle Speedway, mainly because, in the event of an accident, methanol does not produce an opaque cloud of smoke. Since the late 1940s, Methanol is also used as the primary fuel ingredient in the powerplants for radio control, control line and free flight model aircraft (see below), cars and trucks; such engines use a platinum filament glow plug that ignites the methanol vapor through a catalytic reaction. Drag racers, mud racers, and heavily modified tractor pullers also use methanol as the primary fuel source. Methanol is required with a supercharged engine in a Top Alcohol Dragster and, until the end of the 2006 season, all vehicles in the Indianapolis 500 had to run on methanol. As a fuel for mud racers, methanol mixed with gasoline and nitrous oxide produces more power than gasoline and nitrous oxide alone.

Beginning in 1965, pure methanol was used widespread in USAC Indy car competition, which at the time included the Indianapolis 500.

Safety was the predominant influence for the adoption of methanol fuel in the United States open-wheel racing categories. Unlike petroleum fires, methanol fires can be extinguished with plain water. A methanol-based fire burns invisibly, unlike gasoline, which burns with a visible flame. If a fire occurs on the track, there is no flame or smoke to obstruct the view of fast-approaching drivers, but this can also delay visual detection of the fire and the initiation of fire suppression. A seven-car crash on the second lap of the 1964 Indianapolis 500 resulted in USAC's decision to encourage, and later mandate, the use of methanol. Eddie Sachs and Dave MacDonald died in the crash when their gasoline-fueled cars exploded. The gasoline-triggered fire created a dangerous cloud of thick black smoke that completely blocked the view of the track for oncoming cars. Johnny Rutherford, one of the other drivers involved, drove a methanol-fueled car, which also leaked following the crash. While this car burned from the impact of the first fireball, it formed a much smaller inferno than the gasoline cars and one that burned invisibly. That testimony, and pressure from The Indianapolis Star'' writer George Moore, led to the switch to alcohol fuel in 1965.

Methanol was used by the CART circuit during its entire campaign (1979–2007). It is also used by many short track organizations, especially midget, sprint cars, and speedway bikes. Pure methanol was used by the IRL from 1996-2006.

In 2006, in partnership with the ethanol industry, the IRL used a mixture of 10% ethanol and 90% methanol as its fuel. Starting in 2007, the IRL switched to "pure" ethanol, E100.

Methanol fuel is also used extensively in drag racing, primarily in the Top Alcohol category, while between 10% and 20% methanol may be used in Top Fuel classes in addition to Nitromethane.

Formula One racing continues to use gasoline as its fuel, but in prewar grand prix racing methanol was often used in the fuel.

Fuel for model engines

The earliest model engines for free-flight model aircraft flown before the end of World War II used a 3:1 mix of white gas and heavy viscosity motor oil for the two-stroke spark-ignition engines used for the hobby at that time. By 1948, the then-new innovation of glow plug-ignition model engines began to take over the market, requiring the use of methanol fuel to react in a catalytic reaction with the coiled platinum filament in a glow plug for the engine to run, usually using a castor oil-based lubricant contained in the fuel mix at about a 4:1 ratio.  The glow-ignition variety of model engine, because it no longer required an onboard battery, ignition coil, ignition points and capacitor that a spark ignition model engine required, saved valuable weight and allowed model aircraft to have better flight performance. In their traditionally popular two-stroke and increasingly popular four-stroke forms, currently produced single-cylinder methanol-fueled glow engines are the usual choice for radio controlled aircraft for recreational use, for engine sizes that can range from 0.8 cm3 (0.049 cu.in.) to as large as 25 to 32 cm3 (1.5-2.0 cu.in) displacement, and significantly larger displacements for twin and multi-cylinder opposed-cylinder and radial configuration model aircraft engines, many of which are of four-stroke configuration.  Most methanol-fueled model engines, especially those made outside North America, can easily be run on so-called FAI-specification methanol fuel. Such fuel mixtures can be required by the FAI for certain events in so-called FAI "Class F" international competition, that forbid the use of nitromethane as a glow engine fuel component.  In contrast, firms in North America that make methanol-fueled model engines, or who are based outside that continent and have a major market in North America for such miniature powerplants, tend to produce engines that can and often do run best with a certain percentage of nitromethane in the fuel, which when used can be as little as 5% to 10% of volume, and can be as much as 25 to 30% of the total fuel volume.

Cooking
Methanol is used as a cooking fuel in China and its use in India is growing. Its stove and canister need no regulators or pipes.

Fuel Cells 
Methanol is used as fuel in fuel cells. Typically Reformed Methanol Fuel Cell (RMFC) or Direct Methanol Fuel Cell (DMFC) is used. Mobile and stationary applications are typical for methanol fuel cells such as backup power generation, power plant generation, emergency power supply, auxiliary power unit (APU) and battery range extension (electric vehicles, ships).

Toxicity

Methanol occurs naturally in the human body but is poisonous in high concentrations. The human body has the capability of metabolizing and dealing with small amounts of methanol safely, such as from certain artificial sweeteners or fruit, temporarily resulting in toxic byproducts in the blood stream like formic acid prior to excretion, but you have no natural means of dealing with most of what's in a complex, liquid hydrocarbon like gasoline.  Ingestion of 10 ml, however, can cause blindness and 60-100 ml can be fatal if the condition is untreated. Like many volatile chemicals, including ethanol and gasoline, methanol can cause skin, eye, and lung effects if exposed to substantial quantities.  Persons chronically exposed to such external quantities are at risk of long-term systemic health effects similar to low-grade methanol poisoning if left untreated.

US maximum allowed exposure in air (40 h/week) is 1900 mg/m3 for ethanol, 900 mg/m3 for gasoline, and 1260 mg/m3 for methanol. However, it is much less volatile than gasoline and therefore has lower evaporative emissions, producing a lower exposure risk for an equivalent spill.  While methanol offers somewhat different toxicity exposure pathways, the effective toxicity is no worse than those of benzene or gasoline, and methanol poisoning is far easier to treat successfully. One substantial concern is that methanol poisoning generally must be treated while it is still asymptomatic for a full recovery.

Inhalation risk is mitigated by a characteristic pungent odor. At concentrations greater than 2,000 ppm (0.2%) it is generally quite noticeable, however, lower concentrations may remain undetected while still being potentially toxic over longer exposures, and may still present a fire/explosion hazard. Again, this is similar to gasoline and ethanol; standard safety protocols exist for methanol and are very similar to those for gasoline and ethanol.

The use of methanol fuel reduces the exhaust emissions of certain hydrocarbon-related toxins such as benzene and 1,3 butadiene and dramatically reduces long-term groundwater pollution caused by fuel spills. Unlike benzene-family fuels, methanol will rapidly and non-toxically biodegrade with no long-term harm to the environment as long as it is sufficiently diluted.

Fire safety
Methanol is far more difficult to ignite than gasoline and burns about 60% slower. A methanol fire releases energy at around 20% of the rate of a gasoline fire, resulting in a much cooler flame. This results in a much less dangerous fire that is easier to contain with proper protocols. Unlike gasoline fires, water is acceptable and even preferred as a fire suppressant for methanol fires, since this both cools the fire and rapidly dilutes the fuel below the concentration where it will maintain self-flammability.  These facts mean that, as a vehicle fuel, methanol has great safety advantages over gasoline. Ethanol shares many of these same advantages.

Since methanol vapor is heavier than air, it will linger close to the ground or in a pit unless there is good ventilation, and if the concentration of methanol is above 6.7% in the air it can be lit by a spark and will explode above 54 F / 12 C. Once ablaze, an undiluted methanol fire gives off very little visible light, making it potentially very hard to see the fire or even estimate its size in bright daylight, although, in the vast majority of cases, existing pollutants or flammables in the fire (such as tires or asphalt) will color and enhance the visibility of the fire. Ethanol, natural gas, hydrogen, and other existing fuels offer similar fire-safety challenges, and standard safety and firefighting protocols exist for all such fuels.

Post-accident environmental damage mitigation is facilitated by the fact that low-concentration methanol is biodegradable, of low toxicity, and non-persistent in the environment. Post-fire cleanup often merely requires large additional amounts of water to dilute the spilled methanol followed by vacuuming or absorption recovery of the fluid. Any methanol that unavoidably escapes into the environment will have little long-term impact, and with sufficient dilution will rapidly biodegrade with little to no environmental damage due to toxicity. A methanol spill that combines with an existing gasoline spill can cause the mixed methanol/gasoline spill to persist about 30% to 35% longer than the gasoline alone would have done.

Use

In 2019, nearly 100 million tonnes of methanol were used, mainly for chemicals.

United States 

The State of California ran an experimental program from 1980 to 1990 that allowed anyone to convert a gasoline vehicle to 85% methanol with 15% additives of choice.  Over 500 vehicles were converted to high compression and dedicated use of the 85/15 methanol and ethanol.

In 1982 the big three were each given $5,000,000 for design and contracts for 5,000 vehicles to be bought by the State.  It was an early use of low-compression flexible-fuel vehicles.

In 2005, California's Governor, Arnold Schwarzenegger, stopped the use of methanol to join the expanding use of ethanol driven by producers of corn.  In 2007 ethanol was priced at 3 to 4 dollars per gallon (0.8 to 1.05 dollars per liter) at the pump, while methanol made from natural gas remains at 47 cents per gallon (12.5 cents per liter) in bulk, not at the pump.

Presently there are no operating gas stations in California supplying methanol in their pumps.
Rep. Eliot Engel [D-NY17] has introduced "An Open Fuel Standard" Act in Congress: "To require automobile manufacturers to ensure that not less than 80 percent of the automobiles manufactured or sold in the United States by each such manufacturer to operate on fuel mixtures containing 85 percent ethanol, 85 percent methanol, or biodiesel."

European Union
The amended Fuel Quality Directive adopted in 2009 allows up to 3% v/v blend-in of methanol in petrol.

Brazil 
A drive to add an appreciable percentage of methanol to gasoline got very close to implementation in Brazil, following a pilot test set up by a group of scientists involving blending gasoline with methanol between 1989 and 1992. The larger-scale pilot experiment that was to be conducted in São Paulo was vetoed at the last minute by the city's mayor, out of concern for the health of gas station workers, who would not be expected to follow safety precautions. , the idea has not resurfaced.

India 
Niti Aayog, the central planning institute of India, announced on 3 August 2018 that if feasible, passenger vehicles will run on 15% Methanol blended petrol. At present, vehicles in India use up to 10% ethanol-blended fuel. If approved by the government it will cut monthly fuel costs by 10%. In 2021, ethanol costs Rs 60 a litre, while the price of methanol has been estimated at less than Rs 25 a litre.

See also

Alcohol fuel
Biofuel
Butanol fuel
Ethanol fuel
Gasoline gallon equivalent
Glow fuel
Direct methanol fuel cell
List of energy topics
Liquid fuels
Methanol
Methanol economy
Flex fuel vehicles
Peak oil
Reformed methanol fuel cell
Timeline of alcohol fuel
Dimethyl ether

References

External links
Methanol Safety Concerns, Advantages, and Corrosive properties
Commercial-Scale Demonstration of the Liquid Phase Methanol Process, Dept. of Energy Production of methanol by Clean Coal power plants for $.50 - .60 per gallon.
DOE Alternative Fuels Data Center - Methanol
Methanol as an alternative fuel Recording of a discussion with Nobel laureate George Olah broadcast on NPR.
An Energy Revolution by Robert Zubrin Mandating Flexible Fuel Vehicles to run on ethanol and methanol as well as gasoline will defund oil producers who are funding terrorists. The cost per car is $100 – $800.
 the University of Cambridge, General Management of Acute Poisoning, Specific Poisonings: Methanol
Synfuel Cycle Efficiency Physics 240, Stanford University, Fall 2010

Alcohol fuels
Synthetic fuels
Fuel